Hybridella is a genus of Mexican flowering plants in the family Asteraceae.

 Species
 Hybridella anthemidifolia (B.L.Rob. & Greenm.) Olsen - Jalisco
 Hybridella globosa (Ortega) Cass. - San Luis Potosí, Durango, Hidalgo, Zacatecas

References

Heliantheae
Asteraceae genera
Endemic flora of Mexico